Fenton L. Groen (born January 1950)  is a New Hampshire politician currently serving in the New Hampshire House of Representatives since 2020. He formerly served in the New Hampshire Senate from 2010 to 2012.

References

Republican Party New Hampshire state senators
People from Rochester, New Hampshire
Republican Party members of the New Hampshire House of Representatives
1950 births
Living people